Allan Heinberg (born June 29, 1967) is an American film screenwriter, television writer and producer and comic book writer.

Heinberg is the screenwriter of the 2017 film Wonder Woman, directed by Patty Jenkins. His television writing and producing credits include The Naked Truth, Party of Five, Sex and the City, Gilmore Girls, The O.C., Grey's Anatomy, Looking, and Scandal . Most recently, Heinberg developed, wrote, and ran ABC's The Catch, starring Mireille Enos and Peter Krause and also developed the 2022 Netflix series on The Sandman. For Marvel Comics, Heinberg created and wrote Young Avengers and its sequel, Avengers: The Children’s Crusade with co-creator/artist Jim Cheung. For DC Comics, Heinberg co-wrote JLA: Crisis of Conscience with Geoff Johns (art by Chris Batista), and re-launched Wonder Woman with artists Terry and Rachel Dodson.

Early life
Heinberg was born to a Jewish family and is a graduate of Booker T. Washington High School in Tulsa, Oklahoma and Yale University class of 1989. He was in Morse College. Heinberg acted in the Broadway cast of Laughter on the 23rd Floor and appeared off-Broadway in Hello Muddah, Hello Fadduh and the Vineyard Theatre's production of Bob Merrill's Hannah...1939 starring Julie Wilson.

Career

Theatre
A stageplay called The Amazon's Voice helped launch Heinberg's screenwriting career in 1994. The play was produced off-Broadway by the Manhattan Class Company and featured Tim Blake Nelson and Ellen Parker in lead roles.

Comics
Heinberg's Young Avengers was a sales success and fan favorite for Marvel Comics. The series also gained favorable press for its inclusions of two gay characters, Wiccan and the alien Hulkling. Heinberg himself is openly gay. He returned to write for the Young Avengers during the Children's Crusade storyline.

After co-writing a 5-issue arc of DC Comics's JLA with Geoff Johns, Heinberg and artist Terry Dodson relaunched Wonder Woman following the "Infinite Crisis" mini-series.

TV
On television, Heinberg worked on The Naked Truth, Party of Five, Sex and the City, Gilmore Girls, The O.C., Grey's Anatomy, Looking, Scandal and The Catch, and served as Executive Producer of The CW's pilot for their Wonder Woman origin series Amazon in 2012, but the pilot was not picked up to series. In 2019, it was announced that Heinberg would develop a television adaptation of The Sandman for Netflix. He also executive produces the show with Neil Gaiman and David S. Goyer.

Movies
Heinberg wrote the screenplay for the 2017 superhero film Wonder Woman, as well as co-wrote the story with Zack Snyder and Jason Fuchs.

Filmography

Film

Television

Video games

References

External links

 Allan Heinberg at Marvel.com
 

1967 births
Living people
20th-century American screenwriters
21st-century American screenwriters
American male screenwriters
American soap opera writers
American television producers
Jewish American television producers
Jewish American screenwriters
Place of birth missing (living people)
Booker T. Washington High School (Tulsa, Oklahoma) alumni
American gay writers
Yale University alumni
LGBT comics creators
American comics writers
American male television writers
DC Comics people
Marvel Comics people
Hugo Award-winning writers
LGBT men